Kenneth Eugene Boles (January 2, 1933 – August 9, 2022) was an American politician in the state of Florida.

Boles was born in Milton, Florida. He attended Pensacola Junior College, the Alexander Hamilton Institute, and the United States Saving and Loan Institute, and worked in real estate. He served in the Florida House of Representatives from November 7, 1978, to November 2, 1982, as a Democrat, representing the 5th district.

Boles served in the United States Army from 1952 to 1955 during the Korean War era and was a sergeant. He served two years in Germany.

He died on August 9, 2022, at the age of 89. He was buried at Tallahassee National Cemetery.

References

1933 births
2022 deaths
American real estate businesspeople
Burials in Florida
Businesspeople from Florida
Democratic Party members of the Florida House of Representatives
Pensacola Junior College alumni
People from Milton, Florida
Military personnel from Florida
United States Army non-commissioned officers